The ambassador of Great Britain to Sweden was the foremost diplomatic representative in Sweden of the Kingdom of Great Britain, created by the Treaty of Union in 1707, in charge of the British diplomatic mission in Stockholm. The title was more often Envoy extraordinary than ambassador.

For ambassadors to Sweden after 1800, see List of ambassadors of the United Kingdom to Sweden. For envoys before 1707, see List of ambassadors of the Kingdom of England to Sweden.

List of heads of mission

Ambassadors to Sweden

1707–1717: Robert Jackson Commissary in charge, representing England in 1696 and 1703–1707, Great Britain 1707-1710; with title of Minister Resident 1710–1717 and 1717–1729
1707: John Churchill, 1st Duke of Marlborough Plenipontiary
1711–1715: Captain James Jeffreys Minister or Resident in attendance on Charles XII of Sweden
1717–1719 No diplomatic relations
1719–1720: John Carteret, 2nd Baron Carteret Ambassador Extraordinary and Plenipotentiary
1720: Admiral Sir John Norris Plenipontiary
1720–1724: William Finch Envoy extraordinary
1724–1727: Stephen Poyntz Envoy extraordinary; Ambassador from 1727
1726: Vice-Admiral Sir Charles Wager Plenipontiary
1727: Isaac Leheup MP (in Stockholm only 19 days)
1727–1728: Baron von Diescau (Hanoverian envoy) Chargé d'Affaires
1728–1739: Edward Finch MP Envoy extraordinary
1739–1741: John Burnaby Legation secretary
1742–1748: Col. Melchior Guy-Dickens Minister
1748–1763 no mission
1758–1773: Sir John Goodricke, 5th Baronet Nominally Minister, but resident at Copenhagen 1758-1764; then Envoy extraordinary (at Stockholm)
1774–1776: Lewis De Visme Esq Envoy extraordinary
1776–1778: Horace St Paul
1778–1787: Thomas Wroughton
1787–1788: Charles Keene, Chargé d'Affaires
1788–1793: Robert Liston (diplomat) Envoy extraordinary https://web.archive.org/web/20091010220555/http://www.nationalgalleries.org/index.php/collection/online_az/4:322/results/0/3012
1793–1795: Lord Henry John Spencer
1795–1802: Daniel Hailes

References

Sweden
 
Great Britain